Knightsen is a census-designated place (CDP) in Contra Costa County, California, in the United States. As of the 2010 census, the CDP population was 1,568, up from 861 reported in the 2000 census.

History

Knightsen, California is a small unincorporated community of 1,568 residents and 1,500 horses in far eastern Contra Costa County, California in the eastern San Francisco Bay Area closest to Oakley, California. The community was founded by George W. Knight, and its name is a portmanteau of his last name and his wife (Christina Christensen). Knightsen has the oldest chapter of the 4-H Club in California. The community worries about urban sprawl from expanding development in neighboring Oakley.  However, a significant portion of the community lies within the agricultural  conservation zone in the Brentwood, California, general plan.

During the 1880s, settlers began moving in and planting the first almond trees in the area. A few dairies also sprang up. Other crops, such as apricots, grapes and alfalfa were also planted. Until the railroad was built, farmers shipped their produce via water, using Babbes Landing off Dutch Slough, near the north end of what is now Sellers Avenue.

Knightsen was founded in 1898, when the Atchison Topeka and Santa Fe Railroad (Santa Fe Railway) was planning to lay a track through the area to reach Stockton, California. According to local historian, Kathy Leighton, the railroad wanted to name the community Meganos, commemorating the nearby ranch owned by Doctor John Marsh. Local settlers wanted to keep the name Knightsen. Through correspondence with officials in Washington, D.C., a post office named Knightsen was established before the railroad was complete, and George Knight was named first postmaster in mid-1899. He immediately constructed the first retail store in Knightsen, a grocery, in which he could also locate the post office, which opened in 1900.

The first buildings in Knightsen were a station house, a railroad station and a pumping plant, all belonging to the Santa Fe. After Knight's grocery, came the Lyon Brothers asparagus plant, which could ship two to four carloads of asparagus per day during the harvest season. The railroad made shipping crops much easier. During the 1920s, Knightsen was one of the largest milk shipping points in California.

The cost of the project then was $650,000. Even before the project was completed, the district was absorbed by the East Contra Costa Water District. The change from dry farming to irrigation brought other notable changes. The Knightsen Farm Bureau was organized in 1918. It built a hall in 1922 that has since been used for school graduations, dances, weddings, political functions, school plays, holiday celebrations, church services, a safe haven for flood victims and an endless list of other events. John N. Kristich, a pipe manufacturer from King City, California decided to build a plant for manufacturing concrete pipe in Knightsen. His firm became one of the largest producers of concrete pipe in California during the 1920s.

Knightsen has remained primarily a farming community, growing such foods as almonds, walnuts, sunflower seeds, etc. It still contains a few U-pick vegetable/fruit stands. Knightsen now is home to many horse ranches. One report even indicated that the community housed nearly as many horses (1500) as people (1568).

Geography

Demographics

2010
The 2010 United States Census reported that Knightsen had a population of 1,568. The racial makeup of Knightsen was 1,268 (80.9%) White, 14 (0.9%) African American, 8 (0.5%) Native American, 28 (1.8%) Asian, 3 (0.2%) Pacific Islander, 162 (10.3%) from other races, and 85 (5.4%) from two or more races. Hispanic or Latino of any race were 454 persons (29.0%).

The Census reported that 100% of the population lived in households.

There were 531 households, out of which 182 (34.3%) had children under the age of 18 living in them, 330 (62.1%) were opposite-sex married couples living together, 37 (7.0%) had a female householder with no husband present, 33 (6.2%) had a male householder with no wife present.  There were 20 (3.8%) unmarried opposite-sex partnerships, and 6 (1.1%) same-sex married couples or partnerships. 100 households (18.8%) were made up of individuals, and 31 (5.8%) had someone living alone who was 65 years of age or older. The average household size was 2.95.  There were 400 families (75.3% of all households); the average family size was 3.34.

The population was spread out, with 383 people (24.4%) under the age of 18, 138 people (8.8%) aged 18 to 24, 328 people (20.9%) aged 25 to 44, 508 people (32.4%) aged 45 to 64, and 211 people (13.5%) who were 65 years of age or older.  The median age was 42.6 years. For every 100 females, there were 107.7 males.  For every 100 females age 18 and over, there were 106.8 males.

The homeowner vacancy rate was 2.5%; the rental vacancy rate was 2.1%.  1,176 people (75.0% of the population) lived in owner-occupied housing units and 392 people (25.0%) lived in rental housing units.

2000
As of the census of 2000, there were 861 people, 281 households, and 214 families residing in the CDP. The racial makeup of the CDP was 75.96% White, 0.12% Black or African American, 1.39% Native American, 0.23% Asian, 0.70% Pacific Islander, 12.54% from other races, and 9.06% from two or more races.  26.48% of the population were Hispanic or Latino of any race.

There were 281 households, out of which 32.4% had children under the age of 18 living with them, 63.7% were married couples living together, 7.1% had a female householder with no husband present, and 23.8% were non-families. 17.1% of all households were made up of individuals, and 8.9% had someone living alone who was 65 years of age or older.  The average household size was 3.04 and the average family size was 3.42.

In the CDP, the population was spread out, with 27.4% under the age of 18, 7.1% from 18 to 24, 27.3% from 25 to 44, 26.6% from 45 to 64, and 11.6% who were 65 years of age or older.  The median age was 39 years. For every 100 females, there were 97.9 males.  For every 100 females age 18 and over, there were 101.6 males.

The median income for a household in the CDP was $58,929, and the median income for a family was $64,643. Males had a median income of $48,500 versus $32,708 for females. The per capita income for the CDP was $22,191.  About 7.3% of families and 8.7% of the population were below the poverty line, including 5.3% of those under age 18 and 19.8% of those age 65 or over.

Notable residents
 Jeremy Newberry: NFL player.

References

Census-designated places in Contra Costa County, California
Populated places established in 1898
1898 establishments in California
Census-designated places in California